Elusive Quality (January 27, 1993 – March 14, 2018) was an American Thoroughbred racehorse who was a record-setting sprinter on the racetrack and the leading sire in North America of 2004. He sired the 2004 Kentucky Derby winner Smarty Jones.

Background
Elusive Quality was bred in Kentucky by Silver Springs Stud Farm and Marie Costelloe. He was owned by Sheikh Mohammed bin Rashid Al Maktoum, who put him into training with Bill Mott. Elusive Quality was sired by Gone West, a stakes winning son of Mr. Prospector. Elusive Quality's dam, Touch of Greatness, was an unraced daughter of Hero's Honor. She was a granddaughter of 1981 Kentucky Broodmare of the Year Natashka.

Racing career
Elusive Quality raced twenty times and won nine times, including two stakes races, on both turf and dirt. He made his first start as a three-year-old on May 3, 1996 in a maiden special weight race at Belmont Park, which he won in front-running fashion by  lengths. His time for  miles over the sloppy main track was a solid 1:41.20. He was second in his next start, then won his third start, an allowance race at Belmont. Stepped up in class, he finished second in the King's Bishop Stakes at Saratota, nosed out at the wire by Honour and Glory. He was then eighth in the Vosburgh Stakes before being returned to allowance company, in which he finished second and first in his last two starts of the year.

Gone West began his four-year-old campaign on February 21, 1997 in an allowance race at Gulfstream Park. He set a fast pace and continued to open up ground on the rest of the field to win by five lengths. His time of 1:20.17 for seven furlongs set a track record, and earned him the highest Beyer Speed Figure of the year for a sprinter. He was winless in his other four starts that year, with the highlight being a third place finish in the Tom Fool Handicap.

Elusive Quality won four of seven starts at age five. He started the year with an allowance race win on February 5, 1998 at Gulfstream Park, then another allowance win on April 29 at Churchill Downs. Stepped up in class for the Metropolitan Handicap on May 25, he finished eighth. Just six days later though, Mott decided to switch Elusive Quality from dirt to turf. He responded by earning his first graded stakes win in the Jaipur Handicap, prevailing by a head in a time of 1:20.99 for seven furlongs over turf. On July 4 in the Poker Handicap, he went straight to the lead and won by six lengths while setting what was then a world record of 1:31.63 for one mile on the turf. "With this horse," said jockey Jerry Bailey, "you just break and hang on. If he feels like it, he wins. It seems he's more comfortable now that he runs on turf."

He finished his career with a fourth place finish in the Woodbine Mile and a sixth in the Kelso Handicap. His career earnings were $413,284.

Stud career
Elusive Quality retired to stud in 1999 for an initial fee of $10,000. He initially stood at Gainsborough Farm in Versailles, Kentucky before being relocated in 2007 to Darley America's Jonabell Farm in Lexington, Kentucky. During the South American breeding season, he was shuttled to Darley Australia or Stud TNT in Brazil. By 2005, his stud fee had increased to $100,000. At the time of his death in 2018, he had sired 51 graded stakes winners including eight champions. He was also the broodmare sire of 73 black-type winners.

Notable progeny 
c = colt, f = filly, g = gelding''

Death

Elusive Quality was euthanized on March 14, 2018 due to the infirmities of old age.

Pedigree

References

External links
Evasive's page on Haras de Grandcamp's website
Elusive Quality's page on Darley America's website
Elusive Quality's pedigree

1993 racehorse births
2018 racehorse deaths
Racehorses trained in the United States
Racehorses bred in Kentucky
United States Champion Thoroughbred Sires
Thoroughbred family 13-c
Horse racing track record setters